Scopula enucloides is a moth of the family Geometridae. It was described by Schaus in 1901. It is endemic to Mexico.

References

Moths described in 1901
Moths of Central America
enucloides
Taxa named by William Schaus